Angus James Waddell (born 25 July 1964) is a former freestyle swimmer who competed for Australia at the 1992 Summer Olympics in Barcelona, Spain. There he finished in 15th overall position in the 50-metre freestyle.

Angus Waddell finished 10th in the high jump at the 1982 Commonwealth Games in Brisbane and eight years later won a silver medal in the 50-metre freestyle at the 1990 Commonwealth Games in Auckland, New Zealand. This made him the first athlete to compete in the Commonwealth Games in two different sports.

See also
 List of Commonwealth Games medallists in swimming (men)

References

1964 births
Living people
Australian male freestyle swimmers
Australian male high jumpers
Olympic swimmers of Australia
Swimmers at the 1992 Summer Olympics
Commonwealth Games medallists in swimming
Commonwealth Games silver medallists for Australia
Athletes (track and field) at the 1982 Commonwealth Games
Swimmers at the 1990 Commonwealth Games
20th-century Australian people
Medallists at the 1990 Commonwealth Games